Nevenka Nena Mikulić (born ) is a Croatian female kickboxer and boxer, notable for challenging WIBF World flyweight title.

Biography and early career
Nevenka never thought about professional sports, after finishing gymnasium she went to Teacher training college in Zagreb and trained swimming. She started training Muay Thai when returned in hometown Karlovac in Pit119 gym under Reny Cappucci.

She was two times Croatian national Muay Thai amateur champion, and won bronze medal at 2009 I.F.M.A. European championship in Latvia.

Titles
Kickboxing
 2012 Nover Federation European Muay Thai Tules Champion –53 kg.
 2011 SMTL – Slovenian Muay Thai League Champion –54 kg
 2009 I.F.M.A. European Championship –71 kg

Professional boxing record

| style="text-align:center;" colspan="8"|7 Wins (5 knockouts, 2 decisions),  8 Losses, 1 Draws
|-  style="text-align:center; background:#e3e3e3;"
|  style="border-style:none none solid solid; "|Res.
|  style="border-style:none none solid solid; "|Record
|  style="border-style:none none solid solid; "|Opponent
|  style="border-style:none none solid solid; "|Type
|  style="border-style:none none solid solid; "|Rd., Time
|  style="border-style:none none solid solid; "|Date
|  style="border-style:none none solid solid; "|Location
|  style="border-style:none none solid solid; "|Notes
|- align=center
| Loss
| 7–8–1
|align=left| Nina Stojanović 
|
|
| 
|align=left|
|align=left|
|-
|- align=center
| Win
| 7–7–1
|align=left| Katarina Vištica 
|
|
| 
|align=left|
|align=left|
|-
|- align=center
| Loss
| 6–7–1
|align=left| Susi Kentikian
|
|
| 
|align=left|
|align=left|
|-
|- align=center
| Loss
| 6–6–1
|align=left| Jessica Tamara Vargas
|
|
| 
|align=left|
|align=left|
|-
|- align=center
| Win
| 6–5–1
|align=left| Anamarija Boras
|
|
| 
|align=left|
|align=left|
|-
|- align=center
| Loss
| 5–5–1
|align=left| Vissia Trovato
|
|
| 
|align=left|
|align=left|
|-
|- align=center
| Loss
| 5–4–1
|align=left| Valeria Imbrogno
|
|
| 
|align=left|
|align=left|
|-
|- align=center
| Win
| 5–3–1
|align=left| Anamarija Maras
|
|
| 
|align=left|
|align=left|
|-
|- align=center
| Loss
| 4–3–1
|align=left|  Karine Rinaldo
|
|
| 
|align=left|
|align=left|
|-
|- align=center
| Win
| 4–2–1
|align=left|  Kristina Boras
|
|
| 
|align=left|
|align=left|
|- align=center
| Win
| 3–2–1
|align=left|  Ana Mari Grobo
|
|
| 
|align=left|
|align=left|
|- align=center
|style="background: #B0C4DE"|Draw
| 2–2–1
|align=left|  Sanae Jah
|
|
| 
|align=left|
|
|- align=center
| Win
| 2–2
|align=left| Irina Scheuermann
|
|
| 
|align=left|
|
|- align=center
| Loss
| 1–2
|align=left| Johanna Rydberg
|
|
| 
|align=left|
|align=left|
|- align=center
|Loss
| 1–1
|align=left| Paša Malagić
|
|
| 
|align=left|
|align=left|
|- align=center
|Win
| 1–0
|align=left| Manuela Žulj
|
|
| 
|align=left|
|align=left|
|- align=center

Kickboxing record

|-
|-  bgcolor="#FFBBBB"
| 2013-09-29 || Loss ||align=left| Saida Bukvić || WKU Pro Event || Novi Pazar, Serbia || Decision || 3 ||3:00
|-
! style=background:white colspan=9 |
|-  bgcolor="#FFBBBB"
| 2013-04-13 || Loss ||align=left| Ilona Wijmans || Enfusion live 4 || Novo Mesto, Slovenia || Decision || 5 ||3:00
|-
! style=background:white colspan=9 |
|-  bgcolor="#FFBBBB"
| 2012-12-08 || Loss ||align=left| Lucia Krajčovič || Fight Explosion || Bratislava, Slovakia || Decision || 3 || 3:00
|-  bgcolor="#CCFFCC"
| 2012-11-17 || Win ||align=left| Amarhoun Aisha || Mondiali Iron Fighting  || Pordenone, Italy || Decision (Unanimous) || 3 ||   3:00
|-  bgcolor="#CCFFCC"
| 2012-10-27 || Win ||align=left| Lisa de Boer || Bajić Team & Ameno Fight Night || Split, Croatia ||  Decision (Unanimous) || 3 || 3:00
|-  bgcolor="#c5d2ea"
| 2012-09-29 || Draw ||align=left| Amarhoun Aisha || BPN Prvi srpski security grand prix || Novi Sad, Serbia || Decision (Draw) || 3 ||   3:00
|-  bgcolor="#CCFFCC"
| 2012-02-18 || Win ||align=left| Ferida Kirat ||  ||  || Decision (Unanimous) || 5 ||  3:00
|-
! style=background:white colspan=9 |
|-  bgcolor="#CCFFCC"
| 2012-02-10 || Win ||align=left| Đenđi Fleiss || VVVF – Veni Vidi Vici Fights || Karlovac, Croatia || TKO || 1 ||  
|-  bgcolor="#FFBBBB"
| 2011-11-26 || Loss ||align=left| Ghicci Mittino ||  ||  || Decision || 5 ||  3:00
|-
! style=background:white colspan=9 |
|-  bgcolor="#c5d2ea"
| 2011-11-19 || Draw ||align=left| Katia Currò || Trieste fight night  || Trieste, Italy || Decision draw || 3 ||  3:00
|-  bgcolor="#FFBBBB"
| 2011-10-08 || Loss ||align=left| Jemyma Betrian || Muaythai Premier League  || Padova, Italy || Decision || 3 ||  3:00
|-  bgcolor="#CCFFCC"
| 2011-04-09 || Win ||align=left| Tanja Brulc || Slovenian muay thai league || Brežice, Slovenia || TKO ||  || 
|-  bgcolor="#CCFFCC"
| 2011-02-05 || Win ||align=left| Ferida Kirat || The night of champions 2011 || Novo Mesto, Slovenia || Decision || 4 || 2:00
|-
! style=background:white colspan=9 |
|-
|-  bgcolor="#ccffcc"
| 2010-08-11 || Win ||align=left| PloyAmnat || Queen's Cup  || Bangkok, Thailand ||  ||  || 
|-  bgcolor="#FFBBBB"
| 2010 || Loss ||align=left| Sindy Huyer ||  ||  ||  ||  ||  
|-  bgcolor="CCFFCC"
| 2009-02-10 || Win ||align=left| Stefania Macchia || Opatija Fight Night 1 || Opatija, Croatia ||  Decision || 3 || 2:00
|-
|-  bgcolor="CCFFCC"
| 2008-10-18 || Win ||align=left| Mirjana Vace || Opatija Challenger 2008  || Opatija, Croatia ||  Decision ||  || 
|-

|-
|-  bgcolor="#FFBBBB"
| 2010-05-27 || Loss ||align=left| Lena Ovchynnikova || I.F.M.A. European Muaythai Championships 2010 –54 kg  || Velletri, Italy || Decision||4 || 2:00
|-
|-  bgcolor="#FFBBBB"
| 2009-11-27 || Loss ||align=left| Prakaidao Pramari || I.F.M.A. World Championships 2009, Quarter Finals -54 kg  || Bangkok, Thailand || Decision || 4 || 2:00 
|-
|-  bgcolor="#FFBBBB"
| 2009-05 || Loss ||align=left| Anna Zucchelli || I.F.M.A. European Championships 2009, Semi Finals -57 kg || Liepāja, Latvia || Decision || 4|| 2:00
|-
! style=background:white colspan=9 |
|-
|-  bgcolor="#CCFFCC"
| 2009-05 || Win ||align=left|  || I.F.M.A. European Championships 2009, Quarter Finals –57 kg || Liepāja, Latvia || Decision || 4|| 2:00
|-
|-
| colspan=9 | Legend:

References

External links
 Profile at boxrec.com
 Profile at awakeningfighters.com
 Profile at enfusion-tv.com

1979 births
Living people
Croatian women boxers
Croatian female kickboxers